Plethodon is a genus of salamanders in the family Plethodontidae. They are also known as woodland salamanders or, more rarely, slimy salamanders. All members of the genus are endemic to North America (Canada and USA). They have no aquatic larval stage. In some species, such as Plethodon cinereus, the red-backed salamander, eggs are laid underneath a stone or log. Young hatch in the adult form. Members of Plethodon primarily eat small invertebrates. The earliest known fossils of this genus are from the Hemphillian of Tennessee in the United States.

Species
There are 56 species in the genus Plethodon. Listed in alphabetical order of specific name:

Nota bene: A binomial authority in parentheses indicates that the species was originally described in a genus other than Plethodon.

References

 
Amphibian genera
Taxa named by Johann Jakob von Tschudi